Westhaven State Park was a  public recreation area in Grays Harbor County, Washington. The park's acreage was subsumed into the expanded Westport Light State Park in 2016.

References

External links 
Westport Light State Park Washington State Parks and Recreation Commission 
Westhaven and Westport Light State Parks Map Washington State Parks and Recreation Commission 

2016 disestablishments in Washington (state)